The 2020 Conference USA women's basketball tournament was to be a postseason women's basketball tournament for Conference USA that was to be held at The Ford Center at The Star in Frisco, Texas, from March 11 through March 14, 2020. In the first round and quarterfinals, two games were to be played simultaneously within the same arena, with the courts separated by a curtain. On March 12, the NCAA announced that the tournament was cancelled due to the coronavirus pandemic.

Seeds
The top twelve teams will qualify for the tournament. Teams will be seeded by record within the conference, with a tiebreaker system to seed teams with identical conference records.

Schedule

Bracket

All times listed are Central. * denotes overtime.

See also
2020 Conference USA men's basketball tournament

References

Conference USA women's basketball tournament
Sports in Frisco, Texas
2019–20 Conference USA women's basketball season
Conference USA women's basketball
Conference USA women's basketball tournament